Carystoterpa is a genus of spittlebug of the family Aphrophoridae.

Species

References

Aphrophoridae
Insects described in 1936